Avrilly is a commune of the Allier department in the Auvergne-Rhône-Alpes region of central France.

The inhabitants of the commune are known as Avrillois or Avrilloises.

Geography
The eastern border of the commune is also the departmental border between Allier and Saône-et-Loire. Access to the commune is by road D989 from Neuilly-en-Donjon in the west which passes through the south of the commune and continues to Bourg-le-Comte. The D210 branches from the D169 in the north and passes down the eastern side of the commune through the village and continues south, changing to the D229 at the border, to join the D989 north-west of Bourg-le-Comte. The D265 connects the village to the D989 in the west of the commune. The D212 branches from the D989 in the west of the commune and goes north to Luneau. Apart from the village there are the hamlets of Les Raflots and Les Simonins in the west. There are some small scattered forests in the commune but it is mostly farmland.

The Loire river flows along the eastern border of the commune approximately forming the border as it flows north to join the Atlantic Ocean at Saint-Nazaire. The Canal de Roanne à Digoin also flows inside the eastern border parallel to the Loire. A number of streams rise in the commune and flow east to join the Loire forming many ponds.

Neighbouring communes and villages

History
In a papal bull dated April 1164 Pope Alexander III, from his refugee in France, confirmed the Abbey of Saint-Martin of Autun as patron of the Church of Avrilly. The Church was burned down on 15 August 1592. The monks also owned Rejus, a hamlet in Saint-Martin du Lac between the church and Champceau in the parish of Anzy-le-Duc.

Administration

List of Successive Mayors

Demography
In 2017 the commune had 135 inhabitants.

Sites and Monuments

The Church contains a Tabernacle (17th century) which is registered as an historical object.

Avrilly Picture Gallery

See also
Communes of the Allier department

References

External links
Avrilly on the old IGN website 
Avrilly official website 
Community of communes Le Donjon Val Libre website 
Avrilly on Géoportail, National Geographic Institute (IGN) website 
Avrilly on the 1750 Cassini Map

Communes of Allier